Ulaskova tsässon is a small Seto chapel, situated in Ulaskova village, Meremäe rural municipality in Võru County in Estonia.

General information
The building is not state-protected. It is in good condition.

Building data
Ulaskova tsässon is a one-storied pine cross-beam building that has a square floor plan and a gable roof, the outer measurements are 466 x 372 cm, and the building has one interior room (13.9 m2). The outer look of the building has changed significantly: The building used to have an entrance-room and the walls were not covered by boards. The building has a doorway the size of 84 x 155 cm, with a single-sided leaf made from boards fixed on the crosspiece by forged hinges. The door opens on the outside. The building has one wooden window with five panes, painted yellowish-white (45x65 cm). The opening for the window is outlined by profiled boards from the inside.

References

Chapels in Estonia
Setomaa Parish
Buildings and structures in Võru County